Statistics of Ekstraklasa for the 1986–87 season.

Overview
It was contested by 16 teams, and Górnik Zabrze won the championship.

League table

Results

Relegation playoffs
The matches were played on 28 June and 1 July 1987.

Top goalscorers

References

External links
 Poland – List of final tables at RSSSF 

Ekstraklasa seasons
1986–87 in Polish football
Pol